The Schwa Was Here is a young adult novel by Neal Shusterman, published by Dutton Penguin in 2004. It is about an eighth-grader's friendship with another student named Calvin Schwa, who goes almost completely unnoticed by the people around him.

Inspiration
Neal Shusterman stated in an interview that he was inspired to write the book upon doing a Q&A in a school, and not noticing a kid with his hand raised in the middle of the group. Remarking in the interview that upon noticing this he thought, "I want to write a story about an unnoticeable kid and we were in the school library and he was sitting in front of the big dictionary and I thought, well, this kid is kind of like a schwa — that unnoticeable sound in the English language. And that's where the idea came from."

Reception 
The book received critical acclaim upon its release, receiving a starred review from School Library Journal and a positive review from Booklist.  It also received the 2005 Boston Globe/Horn Book Magazine award for fiction and poetry.<ref>Boston Globe-Horn Book Awards.  URL accessed 18 April 2007.</ref>

Adaptations
The book has reportedly been optioned by The Disney Channel for a telefilm project.  Shusterman, who worked with the channel on the project Pixel Perfect'', was lined up to write the script for the project.

It has also been adapted into a three act play by Kory Howard, and was performed for the first time ever in February 2017, by the Manti High School Theatre Department.

References

American young adult novels
2004 American novels
Dutton Penguin books